Giovanni Battista Fiammeri (c. 1530 – 1606) was an Italian painter and Jesuit priest, active in Florence.

He oversaw part of the decoration of the Church of the Gesù in Rome.

References

Sources

External links

 ArteAntica
 Artnet

1530 births
1606 deaths
16th-century Italian Jesuits
16th-century Italian painters
Italian male painters
17th-century Italian painters
Painters from Florence